Georgia Elma Harkness (1891–1974) was an American Methodist theologian and philosopher. Harkness has been described as one of the first significant American female theologians and was important in the movement to legalize the ordination of women in American Methodism.

Harkness was born on April 21, 1891, in Harkness, New York, a town named after her grandfather, to J. Warren and Lillie (née Merrill) Harkness. In 1912, she completed her undergraduate education at Cornell University, which had begun admitting women in 1872. At Cornell, she came under the influence of James Edwin Creighton. She spent several years as a high school teacher before enrolling at Boston University, from which she would receive a Master of Religious Education degree and a Master of Arts degree in philosophy in 1920. She completed her doctoral studies in philosophy at Boston University in 1923 with the submission of a dissertation titled The Philosophy of Thomas Hill Green, with Special Reference to the Relations Between Ethics and the Philosophy of Religion, which was written under the supervision of the Boston personalist philosopher Edgar S. Brightman.

Harkness served on the faculty of Elmira College from 1923 to 1937 and of Mount Holyoke College from 1937 to 1939. Professor of applied theology at Garrett Biblical Institute (1939–1950) and the Pacific School of Religion (1950–1961), she was the first woman to obtain full professorship in an American theological seminary, and became a leading figure in the modern ecumenical movement. She became the first female member of the American Theological Society.

Harkness had an affinity for ministry through poetry and the arts. Her theological interests centered on the influence of the ecumenical church, eschatology, applied theological thought, and a desire for all persons to understand the Christian faith. She made clear a distaste for the doctrine of original sin, saying that "the sooner it disappears, the better for theology and human sympathy."

Harkness died on August 21, 1974, in Claremont, California.

Published works

See also 

 "This is my song" (1934 song)
 United Methodist Church

References

Footnotes

Bibliography

Further reading

External links
 
 Georgia Harkness: Chastened Liberal - Biographical article from Theology Today

1891 births
1974 deaths
20th-century American philosophers
20th-century American theologians
20th-century Methodists
20th-century Protestant theologians
American Christian pacifists
American Christian theologians
American Methodist hymnwriters
American people of Scotch-Irish descent
American United Methodists
American women non-fiction writers
American women philosophers
Boston University School of Theology alumni
Cornell University alumni
Methodist pacifists
Methodist philosophers
Methodist theologians
People in Christian ecumenism
Philosophers from New York (state)
Women Christian theologians
American women hymnwriters
Mount Holyoke College faculty